Siosiua Halanukonuka (born 9 August 1986) is a Tongan rugby union player. He plays in the prop position for the France side  Perpignan. Halanukonuka also represents Tonga at international level.

Club career

The Makos were again Premiership semi-finalists in 2015 and made the final of the 2016 Mitre 10 Cup before losing out 43–27 to local rivals, .   Halanukonuka played 17 times across the 2 seasons, largely appearing as a second-half replacement.

As well as spending several seasons playing in New Zealand's domestic rugby competitions, Halanukonuka spent part of the 2014–15 Rugby Pro D2 season playing as an injury joker for Narbonne.   In total he played 10 times for the French outfit and picked up 2 yellow cards during his time in Occitanie as they finished a disappointing 14th out of 16 teams in the competition.

Faced with stiff competition for places in the Highlanders front row, Halanukonuka acquitted himself well, playing 14 times in his debut season including 8 starts.

Tony Brown replaced the -bound Jamie Joseph as Highlanders head coach ahead of the 2017 season and he opted to retain Halanukonuka in the squad for his first campaign in charge.

On 28 July 2017, Siua travels to Scotland to sign for Glasgow Warriors in the Pro14 on a two-year deal from the 2017–18 season. Halanukonuka was drafted to Marr in the Scottish Premiership for the 2017–18 season. Halanukonuka has been drafted to Ayr in the Scottish Premiership for the 2018–19 season.

On 18 June 2020, Siua returns to France to join Pro D2 outfit Perpignan from the 2020–21 season.

International career
Halanukonuka made his test debut for Tonga on 8 November 2014 in a match against  in Tbilisi, coming on as a second-half replacement in a 23–9 victory for his side. He started in the number 3 jersey in all 3 games which all resulted in victories, including a famous 19–17 win over Italy in Padua on 26 November 2016.

Career Honours

Tasman

ITM Cup Championship - 2013

Super Rugby statistics

References

External links
 
 

1986 births
Living people
Tongan rugby union players
Tonga international rugby union players
Rugby union props
Counties Manukau rugby union players
Auckland rugby union players
Tasman rugby union players
RC Narbonne players
Highlanders (rugby union) players
Expatriate rugby union players in France
People from Tongatapu
Glasgow Warriors players
Marr RFC players
Ayr RFC players